A war god in mythology associated with war, combat, or bloodshed. They occur commonly in both monotheistic and polytheistic religions.

Unlike most gods and goddesses in polytheistic religions, monotheistic deities have traditionally been portrayed in their mythologies as commanding war in order to spread religion. (The intimate connection between "holy war" and the "one true god" belief of monotheism has been noted by many scholars, including Jonathan Kirsch in his book God Against The Gods: The History of the War Between Monotheism and Polytheism and Joseph Campbell in The Masks of God, Vol. 3: Occidental Mythology.)

The following is a list of war deities:

North Africa

Egyptian 
Anhur, god of war, not a native god
Bast, cat-headed goddess associated with war, protection of Lower Egypt and the pharaoh, the sun, perfumes, ointments, and embalming
Horus, god of the king, the sky, war, and protection
Maahes, lion-headed god of war
Menhit, goddess of war, "she who massacres"
Montu, falcon-headed god of war, valor, and the Sun
Neith, goddess of war, hunting, and wisdom
Pakhet, goddess of war
Satis, deification of the floods of the Nile River and an early war, hunting, and fertility goddess
Sekhmet, goddess of warfare, pestilence, and the desert
Set, god of the desert and storms, associated with war
Sobek, god of the Nile, the army, military, fertility, and crocodiles
Sopdu, god of the scorching heat of the summer sun, associated with war
Wepwawet, wolf-god of war and death who later became associated with Anubis and the afterlife

Berber 
Gurzil, bull-headed warrior god.

Sub-Sahara Africa

Nilo-Saharan 
Nubian
Apedemak, Nubian lion-headed warrior god.

Western African-Congo 
Yoruba
Kokou
Ogoun 
Oya

Eastern African-Congo 
Igbo
Amadioha 
Ekwensu

Ethiopian 
Maher, god of war.

Kenya 
Kalenjin
Boryet, Kipsigis Death-wielding god of war. Boryet (also luket) is the act of war. Death (Me'et) is observed as a consequence of war. War is thus personified as such.

Ghanaian 
Akan

 Ta Kora, God of War and Strife for the Akan, and additionally God of Thunder for the Northern Akan peoples, such as the Asante

Europe

Balto-Slavic

Baltic 
 Kara Māte, Latvian goddess of war
 Kauriraris, Lithuanian god of war and war steeds
 Junda, Lithuanian goddess of war

Slavic 
Jarovit, god of vegetation, fertility, and spring, also associated with war and harvest
Perun, god of thunder and lightning, associated with war
Svetovid, god of war, fertility, and abundance
Zorya Utrennyaya, goddess of the morning star, sometimes depicted as a warrior goddess who protected men in battle

Celtic 
Agrona, reconstructed Proto-Celtic name for the river Aeron in Wales, and possibly the name of an associated war goddess
Alaisiagae, a pair of goddesses worshiped in Roman Britain, with parallel Celtic and Germanic titles
Andarta, Brittonic goddess theorized to be associated with victory, overcoming enemies, war
Andraste, Gaulish warrior goddess
Anann, Irish goddess of war, death, predicting death in battle, cattle, prosperity, and fertility
Badb, Irish goddess of war who took the form of a crow; member of the Morrígan
Bandua, Gallaecian God of War
Belatucadros, war god worshipped by soldiers and equated with the Roman war god Mars
Camulus, god of war of the Belgic Remi and British Trinovantes
Catubodua, Gaulish goddess assumed to be associated with victory
Cicolluis, Gaulish and Irish god associated with war
Cocidius, Romano-British god associated with war, hunting and forests
Macha, Irish goddess associated with war, horses, and sovereignty; member of the Morrígan
The Morrígan, Irish triple goddess associated with sovereignty, prophecy, war, and death on the battlefield
Neit, Irish god of war, husband of Nemain of Badb
Nemain, Irish goddess of the frenzied havoc of war; member of the Morrígan
Rudianos, Gaulish god of war
Segomo, Gaulish god of war
Teutates, British and Gaulish god of war and the tribe

Lusitanian 
Neto, god believed to be associated with war, death, and weaponry

Norse-Germanic

Continental Germanic 
Baduhenna, a western Frisii goddess of warfare
Idis (Germanic)/itis/ides, the West Germanic cognates of North Germanic dís, they are connected with battle magic and fettering enemy armies
Sandraudiga, goddess whose name may mean "she who dyes the sand red", suggesting she is a war deity or at least has a warrior aspect
Týr, god of war, single combat, law, justice, and the thing, who later lost much of his religious importance and mythical role to the god Wōden
Wōden, god associated with wisdom, poetry, war, victory, and death

Norse 
Dís, a group of lesser goddesses who are sometimes connected with battle magic; valkyrie may be a kenning for them
Freyja, goddess associated with love, beauty, fertility, gold, seiðr, war, and death
Odin, god associated with wisdom, war, battle, and death
Týr, god associated with law, justice, victory, and heroic glory
Ullr, god associated with archery, skiing, bows, hunting, single combat, and glory
Valkyries, choosers of the slain and connected to Odin, ruler of Valhalla; they may be the same as the dís above

Graeco-Roman

Greek / Hellenic 
Alala, spirit of the war cry
Alke, spirit of courage and battle-strength
Amphillogiai, goddesses of disputes
Androktasiai, spirits of battlefield slaughter
Ares, the main Greek god of war, despised by all the city-states except Sparta
Athena, goddess of wisdom, war strategy, and weaving, more beloved by ancient Greeks than Ares and tutelary deity of Athens, Sparta's rival
Bia, spirit of force and compulsion
Deimos, personification of terror
Enyalius, god of war; in early periods apparently an epithet of Ares, they were differentiated later
Enyo, goddess of war, sometimes appears to be identical to Eris
Eris, goddess of discord and strife
Hera, in the Illiad she has a martial character and fights (and wins) against Artemis; however, this warlike aspect of her appears nowhere else in the surviving corpus, suggesting it was dropped early on
Homados, spirit of the din of battle
Hysminai, female spirits of fighting and combat
Ioke, spirit of onslaught, battle-tumult, and pursuit
Keres, female spirits of violent or cruel death, including death in battle, by accident, murder, or ravaging disease
Kratos, personification of strength and power
Kydoimos, spirit of the din of battle
Makhai, male spirits of fighting and combat
Nike, spirit of victory
Palioxis, spirit of backrush, flight, and retreat from battle
Pallas, Titan god of war-craft and of the springtime campaign season
Perses, the Titan of destruction
Phobos, spirit of panic, fear, flight, and battlefield rout
Phonoi, spirits of murder, killing, and slaughter
Polemos, spirit of war
Proioxis, spirit of onrush and battlefield pursuit
Zeus Stratios, Zeus had the epithet Stratios (Στράτιος), which means "of armies".

Roman 

Bellona, goddess of war
Honos, god of chivalry, honor, and military justice
Juno, has a consistent martial character and the patron goddess of Rome, the mother of Mars and Bellona
Mars, god of war and agriculture, equivalent to Ares as far as being war gods; aside from this they have very little in common
Minerva, goddess of wisdom, medicine, music, crafts, and war, while somewhat equivalent to the Greek Athena, the Romans did not emphasize her war aspect like the Greeks did
Nerio, warrior goddess and personification of valor
Victoria, personification of victory, equivalent to the Greek goddess Nike
Virtus, god of bravery and military strength
Etruscan
Laran, god of war.
Menrva, goddess of war, art, wisdom, and health

Balkan 
Danubian Rider
Sabazios
Thracian Rider

Uralic

Hungarian 
Hadúr, god of war and the metalsmith of the gods

Asia

Turkic 
Kyzaghan, Turkic deity of war

Mongolian 
Begtse, originally a Mongolian war god, was later adopted into Tibetan Buddhism
Dayisun Tngri

East Asia

Chinese 

 Chiyou, god of war
 Di Qing, Star of Military Fortune, God of Valor
 Erlang Shen, a three-eyed warrior
 Guan Yu, Han dynasty general. God of loyalty, righteousness, and valor. 
 Jinzha, marshal of the center altar
 Jiutian Xuannü, goddess of war, sex, and longevity 
 Li Jing, Guardian of Celestial Palace
 Muzha, marshal of the center altar
 Nezha
 Wang Shan, Song dynasty general. Primordial Lord-General of Heaven. Guardian of Celestial Palace
 Wen Qiong 
 Yue Fei
 Zhao Lang (Zhao Gongming), God of Military Fortune, Guardian of Celestial Palace, Protector of Households
 Xue Rengui, Tang dynasty general.

Japanese 
 Futsunushi, god of swords, martial arts, and conquest; god of the Mononobe clan
 Hachiman Daimyōjin, Shinto god of war (on land) and agriculture, divine protector of the Minamoto clan; mostly worshiped by samurai
 Sarutahiko, god of war and misogi.
 Takemikazuchi, god of war, conquest, martial arts, sumo, and lightning; general of the Amatsukami; god of Kashima and Ujigami of Nakatomi clan
 Suwa Myōjin (Takeminakata-no-kami), god of valor and duty, protector of the Japanese religion
 Bishamonten, Buddhist god of war

Korean 
 Yi Sun-sin, admiral of Joseon Dynasty. god of military, guardian of sea.
 Choe Yeong, general of Goryeo period, god of shamans, protector of humanity.
 Pagunseong, the star at the edge of the Big Dipper in Taoism, symbolizing swords.
 Baekmashinjang, god of war who rides a white horse.
 Dungapshinjang, god of war who has the ability of shapeshifting.
 Byeorakshinjang, god of war who uses thunder and lightning, sometimes punishes the evil.
 Damuncheonwang, Buddhist god of war.

Southeast Asia

Filipino

Chacha’: the Bontok god of warriors
Hipag: the Ifugao spirits of war that give soldiers courage on the field of war but are ferocious and cannibalistic
Apolaqui: the Pangasinense war god
Aring Sinukûan: the Kapampangan solar deity governing war and death. He taught early humans metallurgy, woodcutting, rice cultivation, and warfare
Apolake: the Tagalog god of the sun and warriors
Sidapa: another Tagalog god of war, he specifically settles conflicts among mortals
Doce Pares: From the Spanish "Twelve Pairs", they are a group of twelve young Tagalog men who went on a quest to retrieve the Golden Calf of Mount Banahaw, together with José Rizal as a culture hero. They are said to return as giants, bearing the Golden Calf, to aid mankind in war.
Balangaw: a Hiligaynon and Bisaya god of the rainbow and war
Inaginid: a Hiligaynon and Bisaya god of war.
Makanduk: a Hiligaynon and Bisaya god of war.
Lumalayag: the Tagbanwa spirits who challenge and fight the Salakap, spirits of plague and sickness.
Talagbusao: the bloodthirsty Bukidnon god of war.
Pamdiya: the Manobo gods who initiate and preside over war.
Darago: the Bagobo god of warriors, whose consort is Mandarangan.
Mandarangan: the Bagobo war deity married to Darago and resides at the top of Mount Apo. Human sacrifices made to him are rewarded with health, valour in war, and success in the pursuit of wealth.

Vietnamese 

Cao Lỗ, god of military innovations
Độc Cước, the protector of coastal settlements. Legend has it that he split himself in two with his axe, each half guards coastal villages against sea ogres.
Đồng Cổ, the armored protector of the Lý dynasty
Thánh Gióng, god of triumph over foreign invaders.
Trần Hưng Đạo, is the national hero of the Vietnamese people, after his death he was honored as the god of exorcism and the god of war.

South Asia

Hindu-Vedic-and-non-Vedic 

Kartikeya, god of war and victory
Mangala, god of war and Mars
Nirrti, goddess of strife
Parvati, her forms Durga and Kali are known for fighting demons
Shiva, god of destruction, time, and arts. several of his avatars are gods of destroying evil and avenging
Vishnu, god of protection. Several of his avatars are associated with fighting and vanquishing evil.
Indra, god of the weather, kingship, thunder, rains, electricity and the senses. He is also the king of Heaven.

Manipuri
 Marjing, god of war, polo, horse and sports. 
 Panthoibi, goddess of war, love, courage and longevity.

West Asia

Armenian 
Anahit, goddess of healing, fertility, wisdom, and water; in early periods associated with war

Canaanite 
Anat, goddess of war
Astarte, goddess of sex and war, western Semitic version of the Mesopotamian Ishtar and Inanna
Resheph, god of plague and war
Tanit, main Carthaginian goddess whose functions included war and the moon

Hebrew 
Yahweh, originally a warrior god

Hittite 
Šulinkatte, god of war of Hattian origin
Wurrukatte, god of war of Hattian origin
Iyarri, god of war and plague

Hurrian 
Aštabi, a war god of Eblaite origin
Ḫešui, a war god
Nupatik, a god assumed to have warlike character
Shaushka, goddess of love, war, and healing
Ugur, a war god of Mesopotamian origin

Mesopotamian 
Adad, a weather god often portrayed as a warrior
Erra, a god of war associated with Nergal, later syncretised with him
Ilaba, warlike tutelary god of the kings of the Akkadian Empire
Inanna, Sumerian goddess of love, sex and war
Ishtar, Akkadian (later Assyrian and Babylonian) counterpart of Inanna
Nergal, god of war, the underworld, and pestilence
Ninazu, a god of the underworld who could also be portrayed as a war deity
Ningishzida, a god of the underworld who like his father Ninazu could be portrayed as a warrior
Ninurta, warrior god
Pabilsag, warrior god and husband of Ninisina
Pap-nigin-gara, a war god syncretised with Ninurta
Sebitti, group of minor war gods best attested in Assyria
Shara, minor Sumerian god of war
Tishpak, a warrior god from Eshnunna
Zababa, tutelary god of Kish and a war god

Nuristani 
Great Gish, god of war

Oceania

Polynesia 
'Oro, god of war
Rongo, Mangaian god of war and taro

Hawaiian 
Kū, god of war and birds
Pele, goddess of fire, lightning, dance, volcanoes, and violence

Māori 
Maru, god of war and fresh water
Tūmatauenga, god of war and human activities

Americas

North America

Great Plains 
Morning Star, O-pi-ri-kus by one spelling; the god of war in Pawnee mythology

Pacific Northwest 
Qamaits, Nuxálk warrior goddess
Winalagalis, Kwakwaka'wakw god of war

Central American and the Caribbean

Aztec 
Patterns of War
 Huitzilopochtli, god of will, patron of war, fire, and sun; lord of the south
 Mixcoatl, god of war and hunting
 Tlaloc, god of thunder, rain, and earthquakes
 Xipe-Totec, god of force, patron of war, agriculture, vegetation, diseases, seasons, rebirth, hunting, trades, and spring; lord of the east
 Xiuhtecuhtli, god of fire

Mayan 
Tohil, god associated with fire, the sun, rain, mountains, and war

Voodoo 
Ogoun, loa who presides over fire, iron, hunting, politics, and war

References

War
 
 Deities
War deities